Byrsonima  basiloba is a species of plant in the Malpighiaceae family. It is found in Brazil.

References

External links
 
 

 basiloba
Plants described in 1840
Flora of Brazil